, provisional designation , is a trans-Neptunian object and cubewano from the Kuiper belt, located in the outermost region of the Solar System. It was discovered on 8 April 2014, by astronomers with the Pan-STARRS survey at Haleakala Observatory, Hawaii, United States.

Orbit and classification 

 orbits the Sun at a distance of 36.1–51.6 AU once every 290 years and 6 months (106,111 days; semi-major axis of 43.86 AU). Its orbit has an eccentricity of 0.18 and an inclination of 23° with respect to the ecliptic. It has an orbital uncertainty of 2–3. The object's observation arc begins with a precovery taken by Pan-STARRS in April 2012, two years prior to its official discovery observation at Haleakala Observatory in April 2014.

 is a cubewano, a classical, low-eccentricity object in the Kuiper belt, located in between the two prominent resonant populations of the plutinos and twotinos. Due to its relatively high inclination, this cubewano belongs to the "stirred" hot population rather than to the larger cold population.

Numbering and naming 

This minor planet was numbered by the Minor Planet Center on 4 November 2017 and received the number  in the minor planet catalog. As of 2018, it has not been named.

Physical characteristics 

According to the American astronomer Michael Brown, for an object to be considered as a "possible" dwarf planet, its diameter has to measure between 200 and 400 kilometers. With his estimated diameter of 315 kilometers, this object falls into this category, which is the one with the lowest certainty in Brown's 5-class taxonomic system used on his website. Johnston's archive estimates a diameter 336 kilometers using an albedo of 0.09. As of 2018, no spectral type and color indices, nor a rotational lightcurve have been obtained from spectroscopic and photometric observations. The body's color, rotation period, pole and shape remain unknown.

References

External links 
 MPEC 2016-O46 : 2014 GU53, Minor Planet Electronic Circular, 16 July 2016
 M.P.E.C. statistics for F51 – All MPECs
 List of Transneptunian Objects, Minor Planet Center
 Discovery Circumstances: Numbered Minor Planets (505001)-(510000) – Minor Planet Center
 The largest asteroids and outer solar system objects, Wm. Robert Johnston, 20 January 2018
 
 

505624
505624
505624
20140408